Elland Brewery is an independent brewery based in Elland, West Yorkshire, England. Founded as ‘Eastwood and Sanders Fine Ales’ in 2002, after the amalgamation of The West Yorkshire Brewery and The Barge and Barrel Brewing Company, it was renamed as Elland Brewery in 2006 and has been trading under that banner ever since. They have a catalogue of regular draught beers which are produced year round, as well as several popular seasonal beers which are produced at certain times of the year.

Being a West Yorkshire based brewery, their beers are most widely available in the North of England but the popularity of the beers means they're often found at beer festivals in more remote locations. Despite their traditionalism, the brewers have a preference for using foreign hops (largely from the U.S., New Zealand and Germany); this is especially true of their seasonal brews, which are often considered more 'edgy' than their regular ales, but just as popular.

The brewery's flagship ale is Elland 1872 Porter, and accounts for more than 20% of their total output. This beer is a 6.5% Porter, was the winner of the Champion Beer of Britain award at the Campaign for Real Ale (CAMRA) GBBF 2013 Great British Beer Festival.

Regular beers
 Elland Blonde - 4.0% Golden Ale 
 White Prussian - 3.9% Pale Ale
 Nettle Thrasher - 4.4% Bitter 
 South Sea Pale - 4.1% Pale Ale
 1872 Porter - 6.5% Porter

Notable seasonal/special beers
 Summer Breeze - 4.6% Pale Ale
Game Changer - 5.3% Throwback IPA
1872 Port Brett Special - 7.5% barrel-aged porter, featuring Brettanomyces secondary fermentation. Release limited to just eight pins in 2022.

References

Campaign for Real Ale Good Beer Guide editions 2003 to 2023 inclusive (Breweries' section)

External links
Official Site

Companies based in West Yorkshire
Breweries in England